The Tatman Formation is a Wasatchian geologic formation in Wyoming. It preserves fossils dating back to the Ypresian stage of the Eocene period.

Fossil content 
The following fossils have been recovered from the formation:

Flora 

 Allantoidiopsis erosa
 Cercidiphyllum genetrix
 Cnemidaria magna
 Dombeya novimundi
 Eugenia americana
 Lygodium kaulfussi
 Platanus wyomingensis
 Platycarya castaneopsis
 Populus meigsii
 Salvinia preauriculata
 Thelypteris iddingsii
 Zingiberopsis isonervosa
 Alnus sp.
 Equisetum sp.
 aff. Typha sp.
 Alismataceae indet.
 Monocotyledoneae indet.

Wasatchian correlations

See also 

 List of fossiliferous stratigraphic units in Wyoming
 Paleontology in Wyoming
 Wasatch Formation
 Willwood Formation

References

Bibliography 
 

Paleogene geology of Wyoming
Eocene Series of North America
Ypresian Stage
Wasatchian
Shale formations
Fluvial deposits
Paleontology in Wyoming